The 2013 Honda Grand Prix of St. Petersburg was the first race of the 2013 IndyCar Series season, with the race taking place on March 24 in St. Petersburg, Florida, on the city's temporary street course. The race was won by James Hinchcliffe, his first ever victory in the IndyCar Series, coming at his 33rd attempt.

Report

Background
Ryan Hunter-Reay entered this race as the defending series champion, having clinched the title in dramatic fashion in the last race of the previous year, after title rival Will Power spun out early in the race while battling for track position with each other.

The relative lack of rookies for the 2013 season meant that Tristan Vautier and A. J. Allmendinger were the only newcomers onto the grid from last season for this race, with Allmendinger not officially being considered a true rookie by the IndyCar officials due to his previous drives in Champ Car, leaving Vautier the only full-time driver eligible for the Sunoco Rookie of the Year Award.

Qualifying
Will Power once again proved his one-lap dominance on this circuit, taking his 4th consecutive St. Petersburg pole, going nearly 2 tenths of a second faster than his record pole attempt last year, and going fastest in each of the three Qualifying Rounds. Second to him was Japanese driver Takuma Sato, while Simona de Silvestro and James Hinchcliffe took the Second Row, and last year's race winner Hélio Castroneves and impressive rookie Tristan Vautier just behind them. Five different teams had drivers in the Firestone Fast Six, Team Penske being the only team with more than one representative, with both Power and Castroneves.

Further back, defending champ Ryan Hunter-Reay qualified 8th, missing out on qualifying for the Fast Six by less than a tenth of a second, while Chip Ganassi's Scott Dixon failed to progress from the first part of qualifying after his fast lap was disrupted by a piece of track signage left on the circuit from a previous incident.

Race
Will Power stormed away from the field at the green flag, pulling out a lead over Takuma Sato of a few car lengths before he even reached the first corner, a clean getaway was enjoyed by all drivers on the grid on what is often a tricky and incident filled first corner. Power went on to control the first part of the race, pulling out over a 12-second advantage when the yellows came out on Lap 20 after Dario Franchitti slid into the wall just out of the pits on cold tyres, putting him out the race and capping a thoroughly frustrating weekend for the 4-time IndyCar champion.

This incident proved to be costly for Power, as upon the restart, Hélio Castroneves overtook him for the lead at the first corner. Meanwhile, a bunch-up in the midfield caused Ana Beatriz to turn Charlie Kimball's machine around near the back of the field, blocking the track for E. J. Viso, James Jakes and Sebastian Bourdais, Beatriz coming to a stop at the next corner as she'd stalled her car. J. R. Hildebrand also made contact with the wall at Turn 10, having been punted by Sebastián Saavedra, while Simon Pagenaud pulled into the pits to retire with a mechanical issue. Power lost another place to James Hinchcliffe upon the restart after this.

Ryan Hunter-Reay's race came to stuttering end in the pit lane with throttle issues, while Beatriz and Josef Newgarden also suffered similar mechanical woes which forced them out the race, before Saavedra crashed out at Turn 10, bringing out the yellow's once again. It was behind the safety car that a bizarre crash happened, as Power, who was slowing down and speeding up his car to warm his tyres, was clattered into the back of by Hildebrand, who seemingly wasn't looking at the track when Power suddenly slowed until it was too late. Hildebrand's car rode over the top of Power's, coming to a halt in the wall, the suspension broken beyond repair and putting him out of the grand prix. Power's car was less severely damaged, but it also ruined his race, he was running 3rd at the time, and ended up finishing 16th after having to come into the pits to sort out a puncture caused by Hildebrand's car.

Hinchcliffe overtook Castroneves at the restart on Lap 85, after Castroneves made a mistake out of the first corner, which allowed the Canadian to settle into a lead that he never relinquished afterward. Following behind the two leaders was Simona de Silvestro, who had been putting in a very strong performance all weekend, and Scott Dixon, who had driven all way up from 20th to 4th at the restart. Castroneves pressured Hinchcliffe for the entirety of the 25 laps after the restart, but Hinch held on to take the top spot of the podium, Castroneves followed him home 2nd, while de Silvestro had 3rd cruelly snatched from her when she ran wide at the last corner of the penultimate lap, allowing Marco Andretti through to come home 3rd, leading home a tight pack, with just over 6 seconds separating him and Bourdais in 11th place.

Hinchcliffe dedicated his victory to the memory of Dan Wheldon, who had signed a deal to drive the Go Daddy car he was in on the morning of his death in the crash at Las Vegas.

Classification

Qualifying

Starting grid

Race results

Notes
 Points include 1 point for leading at least 1 lap during a race, an additional 2 points for leading the most race laps, and 1 point for Pole Position.

Championship standings after the race
Drivers' Championship standings

References

Honda Grand Prix of St. Petersburg
Grand Prix of St. Petersburg
Honda Grand Prix of St. Petersburg
Honda Grand Prix of St. Petersburg
21st century in St. Petersburg, Florida